Dimitrios Gkaras is a Greek professional footballer who plays as a goalkeeper for A.P.S. Zakynthos. He was born in Veria on March 23,2001 and grew up in Alexandreia Imathia . Also, he studies Philosophy, in University of Ioannina. Before starting his senior career as a footballer, he was a Handball player too.

References 

2001 births
Living people
Greek footballers
Super League Greece 2 players
Trikala F.C. players
Association football goalkeepers
Footballers from Thessaloniki

1) "Στην Κ17 της Ξάνθης ο 16χρονος Δημήτρης Γκάρας"

https://www.football-academies.gr/stin-k17-tis-xanthis-o-16chronos-dimitris-gkaras/

2) " Από την Κ19 της Ξάνθης στην Football League με την φανέλα ιστορικού συλλόγου ο Δημήτρης Γκάρας "
https://sportsaddict.gr/2019/08/07/%CE%B1%CF%80%CE%BF-%CF%84%CE%B7%CE%BD-%CE%BA19-%CF%84%CE%B7%CF%82-%CE%BE%CE%AC%CE%BD%CE%B8%CE%B7%CF%82-%CF%83%CF%84%CE%B7%CE%BD-football-league-%CE%BC%CE%B5-%CF%84%CE%B7%CE%BD-%CF%86%CE%B1%CE%BD%CE%AD/

3) "Στον ΑΟ Ανατολής ο Γκάρας"
http://www.ethosports.com/news/%CF%83%CF%84%CE%BF%CE%BD-%CE%B9%CE%AC%CE%BB%CF%85%CF%83%CE%BF-%CF%81%CF%8C%CE%B4%CE%BF%CF%85-%CE%BF-%CE%B3%CE%BA%CE%AC%CF%81%CE%B1%CF%82/

4) " Ο Γκάρας στον ΑΟ Τρίκαλα "
https://goal-trikala.gr/o-gkaras-ston-ao-trikala/

5)" Μεταγραφή Δημήτρη Γκάρα στον Απόλλωνα Λάρισας "
https://emvolos.gr/metagrafi-dimitri-gkara-ston-apollona-larisas/

6) "Πιερικός : Θωρακίζει την εστία του "
https://www.mikriliga.com/pierikos-thorakizei-tin-estia-tou/

7) "Στην Ζάκυνθο συνεχίζει ο Δημήτρης Γκάρας"
https://sportsup.gr/2023/01/18/sti-zakintho-sinechizei-o-dimitris-gkaras/